
The Malaspina Glacier (Lingít: Sít' Tlein) in southeastern Alaska is the largest piedmont glacier in the world.

Name

The Lingít name translates to Big Glacier. The colonial name for the glacier is in honor of Alessandro Malaspina, a Tuscan explorer in the service of the Spanish Navy, who visited the region in 1791. In 1874, W.H. Dall, of what is now the U.S. National Geodetic Survey, bestowed the name "Malaspina Plateau" on it, not realizing its true geological character.

Geography
The Malaspina Glacier actually comprises Seward Glacier, Agassiz Glacier, and Marvine/Hayden Glacier, which converge as they spill out from the Saint Elias Mountains onto the coastal plain facing the Gulf of Alaska between Icy Bay and Yakutat Bay. Officially, these three glaciers are classified independently, such that Malaspina Glacier does not technically exist. The three glaciers are almost always referred to together, though sometimes only the largest primary piedmont lobe is referred to as Malaspina Glacier. This notable feature is actually part of Seward Glacier, with Agassiz Glacier contributing the secondary piedmont lobe to the west, and Marvine/Hayden Glacier constituting the smallest and most eastern lobe. Although the glaciers fill the plain, nowhere do they actually reach the water and so do not qualify as a tidewater glaciers. Notably, both Seward Glacier and Marvine/Hayden Glaciers terminate near Malaspina Lake, formed during a previous advance. Neither glacier actually terminates in the lake, and therefore are also not classified as lacustrine glaciers.

There are two lakes on its margins: Oily Lake to the northwest, at the foot of the Samovar Hills between the Agassiz and Seward glaciers, and Malaspina Lake to the southeast, close to Yakutat Bay.

Nearly all of the glacier is encompassed by the southeast lobe of the Wrangell-St. Elias National Park and Preserve.

History

In October 1969, the glacier became a National Natural Landmark.

See also 

List of National Natural Landmarks
List of glaciers

Notes

External links
 NPS page

Glaciers of Alaska
National Natural Landmarks in Alaska
Glaciers of Yakutat City and Borough, Alaska
Wrangell–St. Elias National Park and Preserve